Dobrich Province (former name Dobrich okrug) is a province in northeastern Bulgaria, part of Southern Dobruja geographical region. It is bounded on east by the Black Sea, on south by Varna Province, on west by Shumen and Silistra provinces, on the north by Romania. It is divided into 8 municipalities. At the 2011 census, it had a population of 186,016.
The province was part of Romania between 1913 and 1940.

Municipalities

The Dobrich province (област, oblast) contains eight municipalities (singular:  - plural:). The following table shows the names of each municipality in English and Cyrillic, the main town (in bold) or village, and the population of each in December 2009.

Demographics

The following table represents the change of the population in the province after World War II:

Ethnic groups

Total population (2011 census): 189 677

Ethnic groups (2011 census):
Identified themselves: 173 899 persons:
Bulgarians: 131 114 (75.40%)
Turks: 23 484 (13.50%) 
Romani: 15 323 (8.81%)
Others and indefinable: 3 978 (2.29%)

A further 15,000 persons in Dobrich Province did not declare their ethnic group at the 2011 census.

Religion
Religious adherence in the province according to 2001 census:

Towns and villages 

The place names in bold have the status of town (in Bulgarian: град, transliterated as grad). Other localities have the status of village (in Bulgarian: село, transliterated as selo).

Balchik municipality
Albena | Balchik | Bezvoditsa | Bobovets | Bryastovo | Dabrava | Dropla | Gurkovo | Hrabrovo | Karvuna | Kranevo | Kremena | Lyahovo | Obrochishte | Prespa | Rogachevo | Senokos | Sokolovo | Strajitsa | Trigortsi | Tsarichino | Tsarkva | Tuzlata | Zmeevo

Dobrich municipality (city)
Dobrich

Dobrichka municipality (rural)
Altsek | Batovo | Bdintsi | Benkovski | Bogdan | Bojurovo | Branishte | Cherna | Debrene | Dobrevo | Dolina | Donchevo | Draganovo | Dryanovets | Enevo | Feldfebel Denkovo | General Kolevo | Geshanovo | Hitovo | Jitnitsa | Kamen | Kamen Bryag | Karapelit | Kotlentsi | Kozloduytsi | Kragulevo | Lomnitsa | Lovchantsi | Lyaskovo | Malka Smolnitsa | Medovo | Metodievo | Miladinovtsi | Novo Botevo | Odrintsi | Odurtsi | Opanets | Orlova mogila | Ovcharovo | Paskalevo | Pchelino | Pchelnik | Plachi Dol | Pobeda | Podslon | Polkovnik Ivanovo | Polkovnik Minkovo | Polkovnik Sveshtarovo | Popgrigorovo | Prilep | Primortsi | Rosenovo | Samuilovo | Slaveevo | Sliventsi | Smolnitsa | Sokolnik | Stefan Karadja | Stefanovo | Stojer | Svoboda | Tsarevets | Tyanevo | Vedrina | Vladimirovo | Vodnyantsi | Vrachantsi | Vratarite | Zlatia

General Toshevo municipality
Aleksandar Stamboliyski | Balkantsi | Bejanovo | Chernookovo | Dabovik | General Toshevo | Goritsa | Gradini | Izvorovo | Jiten | Kalina | Kapinovo | Kardam | Konare | Kraishte | Krasen | Loznitsa | Lyulyakovo | Malina | Ograjden | Pchelarovo | Petleshkovo | Pisarovo | Plenimir | Preselentsi | Prisad | Ravnets | Rogozina | Rosen | Rositsa | Sarnino | Sirakovo | Snop | Snyagovo | Spasovo | Sredina | Uzovo | Vasilevo | Velikovo | Vichovo | Yovkovo | Zograf

Kavarna municipality
Belgun | Bilo | Bozhurets | Balgarevo | Chelopechene | Hadzhi Dimitar | Irechek | Kamen Bryag | Kavarna | Krupen | Mogilishte | Neykovo | Poruchik Chunchevo | Rakovski | Seltse | Septemvriytsi | Sveti Nikola | Topola | Travnik | Vidno | Vranino

Krushari municipality
Abrit | Aleksandria | Bistrets | Dobrin | Efreytor Bakalovo | Gaber | Kapitan Dimitrovo | Koriten | Krushari | Lozenets | Ognyanovo | Polkovnik Dyakovo | Poruchik Kurdjievo | Severnyak | Severtsi | Telerig | Zagortsi | Zementsi | Zimnitsa

Shabla municipality
Bojanovo | Chernomortsi | Durankulak | Ezerets | Gorichane | Gorun | Granichar | Krapets | Prolez | Shabla | Smin | Staevtsi | Tvarditsa | Tyulenovo | Vaklino | Zahari Stoyanovo

Tervel municipality
Angelariy | Balik | Bezmer | Bojan | Bonevo | Brestnitsa | Chestimensko | Glavantsi | Gradnitsa | Guslar | Kableshkovo | Kladentsi | Kochmar | Kolartsi | Mali izvor | Nova Kamena | Onogur | Orlyak | Polkovnik Savovo | Popgruevo | Profesor Zlatarski | Surnets | Tervel | Voynikovo | Zarnevo | Zheglartsi

See also
Provinces of Bulgaria
Municipalities of Bulgaria
List of cities and towns in Bulgaria
List of villages in Dobrich Province

References

External links
 Dobrich municipality
 Dobrichka municipality

 
Provinces of Bulgaria